It is not entirely evident who first used the branch plant economy concept; however, it has been extensively used in Canadian and UK literature since the 1970s. This concept broadly describes the negative consequences on the growth of the regions whose economies are primarily composed of branch plants that belong to multi-plant firms. Since the position of branch plants within the command chain is low, the regions that host these branch plants tended to be remotely controlled by the plant headquarters, which are usually located distantly. Authors at that time thought that branch plants might create a short-term boom in the regional economies when initial investments were deployed, or when they performed well owing to external factors such as the sector's expansion (e.g., the growth of the Petroleum industry in Aberdeen brought a local economic boom). That boom, however, did not sustain itself over the long term.

In Scotland, it was mainly Scottish journalists and political readers who warned of the danger of Scotland's dependence on English firms' branches in Scotland.

In Canada, an upsurge of Canadian nationalism in the 1960s and early 1970s led the Liberal governments of Lester Pearson and Pierre Trudeau to implement policies aimed at regulating foreign investment. The views of Walter L. Gordon were especially influential in the 1960s. Further left, the Waffle emerged in the New Democratic Party on a program based on Canadian economic nationalism and independence. These developments led to measures such as the creation of Petro-Canada, a government-owned oil and gas company, implemented by the Trudeau government in the mid-1970s to increase Canadian control over the oil industry. The crown corporation was created as one of the demands of the NDP in exchange for their support of Trudeau's minority government. Trudeau also established the Foreign Investment Review Agency to  regulate foreign investment in the economy and limit the takeover of Canadian-owned companies by foreign multinational corporations.

The election of Brian Mulroney's Progressive Conservative  government in the 1984 election brought this period of economic nationalism to an end. Mulroney's government dismantled Foreign Investment Review Agency and moved to privatize Petro-Canada. The Mulroney government's negotiation and implementation of the Canada–US Free Trade Agreement resulted in increased economic integration between the US and Canada, and was opposed by economic nationalists in the 1988 election.

The Canada–US FTA, the North American Free Trade Agreement and the World Trade Organization may bring branch plants to an end as the elimination of many tariffs and trade controls makes it much easier for a foreign supplier to sell in the Canadian market without having a branch plant in the country. Numerous plants, particularly in the textile and manufacturing sector, have shut down and moved to Mexico or other countries with lower wages and costs of production.

References

Canada–United States relations
Economic nationalism
Economy of Canada
Regional economics